Michael W. Riordan (born July 9, 1945) is an American former professional basketball player.

A 6'4" guard/forward from Holy Cross High School (Queens, New York) and Providence College, Riordan played 9 seasons (1968–1977) in the National Basketball Association as a member of the New York Knicks and Baltimore/Capital/Washington Bullets. He scored 6,334 points in his NBA career and won an NBA Championship with the Knicks in 1970. He was traded along with Dave Stallworth and an undisclosed amount of cash to the Baltimore Bullets for Earl Monroe on November 11, 1971. He was named to the NBA All-Defensive Second Team in 1973.

He later owned Riordan's Saloon in Annapolis, Maryland.

Military service
Riordan served in the United States Air Force, where he was a mechanic and played basketball at night. While playing for the Knicks, Riordan was in the New York Air National Guard at the 274th Mobile Communications Squadron located at Roslyn Air National Guard Station, New York.

References

External links
Career statistics

1945 births
Living people
Allentown Jets players
American men's basketball players
American military sports players
Baltimore Bullets (1963–1973) players
Basketball players from New York City
Capital Bullets players
Holy Cross High School (Flushing) alumni
New York Knicks draft picks
New York Knicks players
New York National Guard personnel
Providence Friars men's basketball players
Shooting guards
Small forwards
Sportspeople from Queens, New York
Washington Bullets players
United States Air Force airmen